
This List of Adelaide obsolete suburb names gives suburb names which were officially discontinued before 1994, and their new names or the suburbs into which they were incorporated.

Notes

References

Sources
Directory of South Australia, 1962. Adelaide: Sands and McDougall, 1962;  p. A21
UBD Street Directory (Adelaide) 1993, p.8–p.10. Universal Press Ltd.

See also

List of Adelaide suburbs
Local government areas of South Australia
List of Adelaide railway stations

Lists of suburbs in Australia

 
History of Adelaide
Lists of place names